Mickaël Lauret (born 15 November 1977 in Châtellerault, France) is a retired professional footballer. He played as a defender.

External links
Mickaël Lauret profile at chamoisfc79.fr

1977 births
Living people
French footballers
Association football defenders
Chamois Niortais F.C. players
Ligue 2 players

Association football midfielders